Wijedasa Liyanarachchi (19?? – 2 September 1989) was a Sri Lankan lawyer. His death from wounds received while in police custody made him a cause célèbre for human rights in Sri Lanka during the 1987–1989 JVP insurrection.

See also
State terrorism in Sri Lanka
1987–89 JVP Insurrection

References

Sri Lankan human rights activists
People murdered in Sri Lanka
Sinhalese lawyers
1989 deaths

People killed by law enforcement officers in Sri Lanka